Carlo Pagulayan (born June 24, 1978) is a Filipino freelance comic book artist.

Early life
He graduated with a bachelor's degree in Industrial Engineering from the Santo Tomas branch campus of the Polytechnic University of the Philippines in Santo Tomas, Batangas.

Career
Pagulayan began his career with a 3-page sequential for Dark Horse Comics, written by Doug Petrie, to aid the victims of the 9-11 attacks, and as a tribute to the fallen World Trade Center Twin Towers (2001). He has since had assignments with both Marvel and DC, including runs on Elektra, Emma Frost, The Incredible Hulk, and Deathstroke.

He was a penciler on Marvel's popular Planet Hulk storyline, which was adapted into an 
animated feature film in 2010. Elements from the story were also incorporated into the Marvel Studios film Thor: Ragnarok (2017). Pagulayan co-created the Sakaaran race which have appeared in Guardians of the Galaxy (2014) and Avengers: Endgame (2019).

Bibliography 
Comics work (interior pencil art) includes:

DC
Convergence #1-2, 8 (2015)
Telos #1-2, 4 (2015–16)
Batman and Robin Eternal #26 (2016)
Deathstroke, vol. 4, #1-2, 6–8, 15–16, 19–20, 25, 30–32, 34–35, 42–43, 48-50 (2016–19)
Deathstroke: Rebirth #1 (2016)
Wonder Woman, vol. 5, #31, 36-37 (2017)

Marvel
Agents of Atlas v2 #1-2, 5, 7-8 (2009)
Avengers vs. X-Men #1 (2012)
Elektra #11-15, 18, 21-22 (2002) 
Emma Frost #7-12, 14, 16-18 (2003) 
Hulk #34-35, 50-52 (2011–12)
Incredible Hulk #92-95, 101, 104–5, 109-10 (2006–07)
Invincible Iron Man #27 (2008)
Iron Man: Director of SHIELD #29-32 (2008)
Marvel Adventures Fantastic Four #1-3, 9 (plus covers), (2005) 
Mighty Avengers #20 (2009)
New X-Men Academy X #9 (2004) 
What If: Sub-Mariner cover (2005)
X-Men Unlimited #7 (2004)
X-Men vs. Agents of Atlas #1-2 (2009–10)

Other Publishers
WTC Tribute Book, Dark Horse Comics (2001)
Icons Of Evil: Trap Jaw, MVCreations (2002)

References
Guisadong Gulay - deviantART
Carlo Pagulayan - Official site

Filipino comics artists
1978 births
Living people
Polytechnic University of the Philippines alumni